Mikhaylovskoye is a rural locality (a selo) and the administrative center of Mikhaylovskoye Rural Settlement, Kharovsky District, Vologda Oblast, Russia. The population was 274 as of 2002. There are 8 streets.

Geography 
Mikhaylovskoye is located 17 km east of Kharovsk (the district's administrative centre) by road. Parshinskaya is the nearest rural locality.

References 

Rural localities in Kharovsky District